Kalusta is a village on the banks of Vashishti River, in Chiplun taluka, Konkan division of Maharashtra, India.

Notable individuals 
 Ghulam Ahmed Hasan Mohammed Parkar, cricketer
 Zulfiqar Ahmed Hasan Parkar, Ghulam's brother and fellow cricketer

See also 
 Gowalkot
 Konkan
 Ratnagiri district
 Western Ghats

References 

Villages in Ratnagiri district